Reichsrat is a legislative body in German-speaking countries similar to the Upper House of a Parliament. The cognate in Scandinavian countries is Riksråd. These may refer to:
 Reichsrat (Austria), the parliament of the Cisleithanian part of Austria-Hungary (1867–1918)
 Reichsrat (Germany), a body representing the German States in the Weimar Republic (1919–1933)
 Riksråd, various Royal Councils in Scandinavian countries
 Riksrådet, the Privy Council of Sweden

See also 
 Reichstag (disambiguation), the directly elected body or Lower House of parliaments in various German-speaking countries
 Riksdag (disambiguation), the cognate of Reichstag in Scandinavian countries
 Rigsdagen, Parliament of Denmark (1849–1953)
 In modern Germany, the Bundestag and Bundesrat are the two chambers of parliament